Sin (also known as The Beloved and Restless) is a 1971 film written and directed by George P. Cosmatos, and marked his directorial debut.

Plot

A beautiful but frustrated housewife begins an affair with a former childhood friend. When her suspicious husband starts to show signs of jealousy, the adulterous couple plot to murder him.

Cast
 Raquel Welch as  Elena
 Richard Johnson as Orestes
 Jack Hawkins as Father Nicholas
 Flora Robson as Antigone
 Tahnee Welch as Young Elena

Production
The film was the second movie produced by Patrick Curtis, Raquel Welch's husband and manager. It was financed by a group of wealthy Cypriot businessmen. It was based on a play by Cosmatos titled The Day of the Midwife.

Filming
Filming began on location in Cyprus on August 15, 1970.

Release

It was released in the US by Cinemation.

On 2 June 1986, the British Board of Film Classification announced that the film on home video would receive a 15 certificate rating.

Home media
The film was originally released in the United Kingdom in 1986 on VHS and given a 15 certificate rating. All home media releases in the U.K. were titled Sin. It was reissued in the U.K. under Scorebox Film Group on DVD in 2008 and again by Screenbound Pictures in August 2017.

Reception

Box office

Critical response

References

External links
 
 
  
 

1971 films
1971 drama films
Adultery in films
Films shot in Cyprus
Films directed by George P. Cosmatos
British drama films
Films set in Cyprus
1971 directorial debut films
1970s English-language films
1970s British films